is a Japanese former footballer who last played for Ococias Kyoto AC.

Career
Firstly signed by Blaublitz Akita for the maiden season of J3 League, he switched to Fujieda MYFC after two seasons.

Club statistics
Updated to 23 February 2020.

References

External links

Profile at Fujieda MYFC

1992 births
Living people
Kyoto Sangyo University alumni
Association football people from Osaka Prefecture
Japanese footballers
J3 League players
Japan Football League players
Blaublitz Akita players
Fujieda MYFC players
Nara Club players
Ococias Kyoto AC players
Association football goalkeepers